Ophni is a Hebrew Old Testament name meaning mouldy.

A city of Benjamin so important as to be second only to Jerusalem. It still survives in the modern Jifna or Jufna, 23 miles northwest of Bethel. 

Hebrew Bible cities